The 1982 Rutgers Scarlet Knights football team represented Rutgers University in the 1982 NCAA Division I-A football season. In their 10th season under head coach Frank R. Burns, the Scarlet Knights compiled a 5–6 record while competing as an independent and were outscored by their opponents 278 to 180. The team's statistical leaders included Jacque LaPrarie with 1,164 passing yards, Albert Smith with 466 rushing yards, and Andrew Baker with 472 receiving yards.

Schedule

Roster

References

Rutgers
Rutgers Scarlet Knights football seasons
Rutgers Scarlet Knights football